Abbasuddin Ahmed (27 October 1901 – 30 December 1959) was a Bengali folk song composer and singer born in the Bengal province of British India. He was known for Bhawaiya folk song which is a style commonly found in Rangpur,  Undivided Goalpara district  and Cooch Behar

Early life 

Ahmed was born in the Tufanganj subdivision of Cooch Behar district (now in India). His father, Zafar Ali Ahmed, was a lawyer at Tufanganj court. His was educated in schools and a college in North Bengal and was attracted to music by the cultural programs the offered. He was largely a self-taught composer and singer, though for a brief period he learned music from Ustad Jamiruddin Khan in Kolkata.

Career 

Ahmed started his career by singing modern Bangla songs for the HMV studios, followed by modern songs of poet Kazi Nazrul Islam, the national poet of Bangladesh. He then proposed to Nazrul Islam to write and tune Islamic songs, which he sang in numerous numbers and recorded for the HMV studios. He has a pioneering role in bringing the music to the home of the Indian Muslims and arousing them from a state of backwardness. He was the first Muslim in erstwhile India who used his own name in the record labels. Before Abbassddin Ahmed, Muslim singers would use pseudo names, so that their Muslim identity would be anonymous. He later recorded Bhawaiya, Khirol and Chatka which were famous in Undivided Goalpara District,  Cooch Behar and Rangpur. Later he started to sing other folk songs like jaari, sari, bhatiyali, murshidi, bichchhedi (songs of estrangement), marsiya, dehatattwa, and musical plays. He also collaborated with, Jasimuddin and Golam Mostafa.

Awards
 Pride of Performance (1960)
 Shilpakala Academy Award (1979)
 Independence Day Award (1981)

Legacy
Ahmed's first son Mustafa Kamal served as the Chief Justice of Bangladesh during June–Dec 1999. His only daughter, Ferdausi Rahman is a classical musician. His youngest son, Mustafa Zaman Abbasi, is a folk researcher, writer, singer and social worker.

Ahmed's granddaughter, Nashid Kamal, daughter of Mustafa Kamal, is a singer, professor of demography and writer.

References 

1901 births
1959 deaths
Bengali musicians
Recipients of the Independence Day Award
Recipients of the Pride of Performance
20th-century Indian musicians
Place of death missing
Bangladeshi people of Indian descent
Musicians from West Bengal